Strmovo (Serbian Cyrillic: Стрмово) is a village situated in the Lazarevac municipality of Serbia.

References

Suburbs of Belgrade
Lazarevac